Chris Antonopoulos (born on 7 November 1973 in Dallas, Texas) is an American rock drummer, most notable for his tenure in
Opiate for the Masses.

Career
Antonopoulos joined Phoenix/Los Angeles hard rock band Opiate for the Masses as a drummer in 2004. Before this time, he was a drummer for Vanilla Ice for three years. In 2006, he toured with the Revolting Cocks.  On 21 August 2008, he played with Ron "Bumblefoot" Thal's (Guns N' Roses) All Star Band at Rock Against Diabetes. On 3 November 2008, he left Opiate for the Masses and joined German bands Atrocity and Leaves' Eyes. He resigned from Atrocity on 27 March 2010. Seven currently plays drums for the Belgian band Channel Zero and appears in the band's 2018 Exit Humanity documentary .

Seven describes his approach to the drums as "the idea of putting on a show as well as having fun and playing. He has been featured in Modern Drummer, China's Modern Player and Drum Magazine and blogged for Modern Drummer.

He performed with the Percussive Arts Society (PASIC) in 2008 and has delivered drum clinics around the world in the United States, China, Sweden and Norway.

Seven also serves as host of the YouTube series Metal Wine Guide which brings together metal musicians who love wine and the canned wine industry.

Equipment
Drums - PDP and DW
 18x24 bass drum (2x)
 12x14 floor tom used between bass drums in place of rack tom
 16x18 floor tom
 18x20 bass drum on floor tom legs used as floor tom
 14x16 floor tom (on left side)
 7x14 DW cast steel snare
 6x12 DW Edge snare

Cymbals - Sabian
(from left to right)
 20" APX Solid Crash
 20" AA Metal-X Chinese
 14" AAX X-Celerator Hi-Hats
 20" AA Metal-X Crash
 20" AAX Metal Crash
 24" (custom) HH Power Bell Ride
 20" AA Rock Crash
 20" HH Chinese
 20" Paragon Crash
 12" Chopper
 20" AA Rock Crash
 9" Alu Bell (mounted on top of 2nd AA rock crash)

Drumheads - Aquarian
Snare: Hi-Energy (Batter); Classic Clear Snare Side (Reso)
All Toms: Clear Performance II (Batter); Classic Clear Video Gloss Black (Reso)
Bass: Superkick II (Batter); Regulator Small Hole (Reso)

Drumsticks-Vic Firth
Vic Firth American Classic rock w/ wood tips

Associated acts 
 Channel Zero (2014–Present) - member
Beasto Blanco (2019) - touring
 Brand New Machine (2013–2014) - member
 Livan (2011–2013) - touring
 Atrocity (2008-2010) - member
 Leaves' Eyes (2008-2010) - member
Revolting Cocks (2006) - touring
 Opiate for the Masses  (2005-2008) - member
 Vanilla Ice (2001-2004) - touring
 Hellafied Funk Crew (1996-2001) - member
 Lone Star Trio (1993-1996) - member

Discography

with Lone Star Trio

Studio albums
21 Songs (1993)
Four Play (1995)

with Hellafied Funk Crew
1998 "Hellafied Funk Crew"

with V-Ice

Studio albums

2001 	Bi-Polar

with Opiate for the Masses

Studio albums
The Spore (2005)
Manifesto (2008)

Compilations
Jagermeister Music Tour (2006)
Taste of Christmas (2005)
Saw II soundtrack
Saw III soundtrack
The Best of Taste of Chaos
The Best of Taste of Chaos Two.

with Leaves' Eyes

Albums 
 Njord (2009)

with Atrocity

Albums 

 After the Storm (2010)

with Liv Kristine

Albums 

 Skintight (2010)

with Channel Zero

Albums 
 Channel Zero Unplugged (2017)
Exit Humanity (2017)
Channel Zero 30th Anniversary (2020)

Live Session Member Of
 Revolting Cocks 2006–present

Personal life
Antonopoulos became fast friends with Ministry’s Al Jourgensen and was married to Anna Kjellberg who also played in his former band Opiate for the Masses.

References

1973 births
Living people
American heavy metal drummers
American people of Greek descent
20th-century American drummers
American male drummers
Leaves' Eyes members
Opiate for the Masses members
21st-century American drummers
20th-century American male musicians
21st-century American male musicians